Jenny Jump Mountain is a mountain in Warren County, New Jersey. It is part of the New York–New Jersey Highlands of the Appalachian Mountains, although somewhat isolated to the west of the main body of the Highlands.

Portions of Jenny Jump Mountain are within Jenny Jump State Forest.

History
An 1834 description read,

In popular culture
Children's author John R. Neill, who regularly illustrated the sequels to L. Frank Baum and Ruth Plumly Thompson's Wizard of Oz series, before taking over the writing himself, lived in New Jersey during his last years. He gave the name Jenny Jump to his signature character, an adventurous New Jersey girl who first appeared in The Wonder City of Oz (1940).

References 

Mountains of Warren County, New Jersey
Mountains of New Jersey